is a retired Japanese football midfielder who last played for Muktijoddha Sangsad KC in Bangladesh. Kato is the second Japanese player to play in Argentina's top division football league after Naohiro Takahara.

At the age of 14, he went to Argentina to learn football, and after graduating from high school, went to Argentina again to play football.

He is the first Japanese football player to play in the first division (Primera Division) after promoting from the U-20 in Argentina.

Antonio Mohamed, the manager of that time, said, “Kato is my son. He has a great scoring ability.”

The manager Osvaldo Ardiles said, “He can definitely play well in J League.”

The teammates who have played together so far are Javier Pastore, Dani Osvaldo, Joaquín Larrivey and Mario Bolatti.

When he played in Thailand, he played under Sven-Göran Eriksson and was said, “I assure that Kato’s ability to play in Thailand’s top team.”

Career

Argentina
Kato made Japanese football history when he joined Argentine Primera División side Huracán. He stayed there from 2006–2010 making 15 league appearances and scoring once. Kato scored his first goal for Huracán against Talleres de Cordoba in 2007.

Dempo
On 30 January 2012 it was confirmed that Kato had signed a deal with Indian I-League team Dempo S.C. for the 2011–12 season. He scored his first goal in I-League for Dempo S.C. on 24 March 2012 against HAL SC, in which Dempo won 3–0.

Muktijoddha Sangsad KC
Kato had his first stint with Muktijoddha Sangsad KC during the 2018–19 Bangladesh Premier League season. After spending the 2019-20 season with Sheikh Jamal DC he returned to the club, on 16 November 2020. Before the start of the 2021 Bangladesh Premier League season the clubs higher-ups decided against participating in the league due to financial problems. Kato helped the club tremendously by seeking help from the Japanese community and was able to get a donation of Tk30. The donations allowed the club to take part in the Bangladesh Premier League and they ended the season finishing in tenth place out of 13 teams which was safe from relegation.

On 18 November 2021, before the start of the 2021–22 Bangladesh Premier League season, Kato retired from professional football and became a member of Muktijoddha's coaching staff for a short while. He is thought to be a modern day Muktijoddha Sangsad KC legend.

Honours
Dempo SC
  I-League: 2011–12
South China

 Hong Kong FA Cup Runner-up: 2016–17

References

External links
 
 
https://www.facebook.com/Yusukekatofanclub1

1986 births
Living people
Japanese footballers
Japanese expatriate footballers
Club Atlético Huracán footballers
Defensores de Belgrano footballers
Dempo SC players
Yusuke Kato
Yusuke Kato
Yusuke Kato
Yusuke Kato
Yusuke Kato
Yusuke Kato
South China AA players
Gresik United players
Muktijoddha Sangsad KC players
Sheikh Jamal Dhanmondi Club players
Japan Football League players
I-League players
Yusuke Kato
Yusuke Kato
Bangladesh Football Premier League players
Hong Kong Premier League players
Liga 1 (Indonesia) players
Association football midfielders
Japanese expatriate sportspeople in Thailand
Japanese expatriate sportspeople in Hong Kong
Japanese expatriate sportspeople in India
Japanese expatriate sportspeople in Bangladesh
Japanese expatriate sportspeople in Indonesia
Expatriate footballers in Hong Kong
Expatriate footballers in Thailand
Expatriate footballers in India
Expatriate footballers in Argentina
Expatriate footballers in Bangladesh
Expatriate footballers in Indonesia